Wajah Tum Ho is a 2016 Indian Hindi-language erotic-crime mystery thriller film directed by Vishal Pandya. It features Sharman Joshi, Gurmeet Choudhary and Sana Khan, in lead roles. The film revolves around a live murder committed on television.

The production of the film began in February 2016 and principal photography was commenced in May 2016 in Mumbai and was wrapped by October 2016. The trailer was released on 14 October 2016. The film was released on 16 December 2016.

Plot
The movie starts by showing a lodge where a policeman is raping a young girl and then goes out to meet the girl's boyfriend. The policeman blackmailed the couple because he caught them with drugs and the girl made a deal with him to have sex in exchange for dropping all charges. After the policeman leaves, he gets into an accident. When he regains his consciousness, he finds himself chained where a computer genius hacks a TV channel owned by Rahul Oberoi and broadcasts the live murder of a police officer called Ramesh Sarniak. The Assistant Commissioner of Police, Kabir Deshmukh, interrogates Rahul Oberoi wherein Siya, a lawyer, tries to defend his case. Sia has her boyfriend Ranveer Bajaj whom she has an intimate relationship with him . He is a  prosecution lawyer.

During the investigation, Kabir Deshmukh considers Karan Parekh, Rahul's old business partner, to be the suspect. ACP Deshmukh tracks Karan's location in a hotel and goes to catch him. Upon reaching the hotel, he discovers that Karan is missing and is also being murdered on live television. Later, ACP Deshmukh finds out that Rahul and Karan were involved in raping a girl named Rajni, an employee in Rahul's company. ACP Deshmukh reveals this to Ranveer and Sia wherein Ranveer speaks out about the fact that an old man had saved Rajni from being raped and filed a complaint against Rahul and Karan. At that time, Rahul and Karan were prosecuted by Ranveer in the court. However, Ranveer lost the case as the old man had died in a fire explosion in his house and was the only witness for that case.

Now, it is clear that Rahul was not involved in any of the murders. Eventually, the police consider Rajni to be the suspect. Rahul now decides to flee India, but is not allowed to leave because his sugar level drastically increases. In no time, the police get to know that Rajni has gone missing and learn that Mac, Rajni's boyfriend who is also an employee in Rahul's company, is involved in the murders.

As ACP Deshmukh learns that Rahul is to be hospitalized, he goes in search of Mac to save Rahul from being killed. ACP Deshmukh runs behind that ambulance and learns that Rahul is missing. Mac takes Rahul to the same place where the police officer, Ramesh Sarniak, and Karan Parekh had been killed. Rahul finds himself tied and gets shocked when he sees Sia there. Sia reveals to Rahul that she is the one who killed the officer Sarnaik and Karan. It is further revealed by Sia that the old man who helped Rajni didn't die in an explosion but was murdered by Rahul, Karan, and the officer Sarnaik. Sia further reveals that the old man who was killed was Sia's father. Sia then attempts to kill Rahul by increasing his sugar level. During the process, Rahul reveals to Sia that it was of no use to kill them as the real killer is still alive. Rahul tells her that Ranveer was bribed by Rahul and Karan to save them and also planned the murder.

Thus, Rahul dies and, heartbroken, Sia leaves from there. Soon, ACP Deshmukh discovers that Sia is the killer. Sia takes Ranveer to the same place where the murders were committed and reveals to him the truth and also tells him to admit his crime. Knowing this, Ranveer refuses to do so but is being tricked by Sia as she had called the police and the whole statement was recorded and traced during her call.

This leads to a fight between them in which ACP Deshmukh arrives and fights with Ranveer. During the fight Ranveer is killed, and ACP Deshmukh knowing what he and the other murder victims had done, decides to not press any charges against Sia and sets her free.

Cast
 Sharman Joshi as Assistant Commissioner of Police Kabir Deshmukh 
 Gurmeet Choudhary as Ranveer Bajaj : Siya's Boyfriend
 Sana Khan as Siya a.k.a. Ankita Sharma : Ranveer's Girlfriend
 Rajneesh Duggal as Rahul Oberoi
 Leena Kapoor as Karan's Girlfriend 
 Himmanshoo A. Malhotra as Karan Parekh
 Deepen Gandhi as Head of Cyber Crime
 Rahul Rana as Inspector Gaitonde, Kabir's assistant
Manisha Saxena as Rahul's Secretary
 Prarthana Behere as Rajni
 Sherlyn Chopra in an item number in the song "Dil Mein Chhuppa Loonga"
 Zareen Khan in an item number in the song "Maahi Ve"

Production

Sana Khan, Sharman Joshi and Gurmeet Chaudhary were signed in by T-Series for this film. Marathi actress Prarthana Behere was also signed for this film. Filming was wrapped up within five months, between May and October 2016.

The film borrows its title from a song in the film Hate Story 3, which was also produced by Bhushan Kumar.

The film was shot in Mumbai and Georgia. Zareen Khan did a special appearance for the song "Maahi Ve".

CBFC granted A certificate to Wajah Tum Ho.

Soundtrack
The full soundtrack of the film was released on 4 November 2016 which includes nine songs, out of which three are recreated versions of yesteryear classics.

Three old Hindi film songs – "Pal Pal Dil Ke Paas" (1973 film Blackmail) starting Dharmendra , "Aise Na Mujhe Tum Dekho" (1977 film Darling Darling) and "Maahi Ve" (2002 film Kaante) were used in Wajah Tum Ho.
Arijit Singh publicly accused music producer and composer Abhijit Vaghani for retuning his voice in the film. Tulsi Kumar sings for four tracks in Wajah Tum Ho. The music rights of the film are acquired by T-Series.

Box office
The film was commercially unsuccessful, grossing approximately 214.0 million worldwide against a small budget of 140 million.

References

External links

T-Series (company) films
2010s Hindi-language films
Indian erotic thriller films
Films scored by Abhijit Vaghani
Films scored by Gourov Roshin
Films scored by Mithoon
Films scored by Meet Bros Anjjan
Films shot in Georgia (country)
Films shot in Mumbai
2016 films
Films directed by Vishal Pandya